Narona  is a genus of sea snails, marine gastropod mollusks in the family Cancellariidae, the nutmeg snails.

Species
Species within the genus Narona  include:
 † Narona barystoma (Woodring, 1970) 
 Narona clavatula (G.B. Sowerby I, 1832) 
 † Narona decaptyx (Brown & Pilsbry, 1911) 
  Narona exopleura (Dall, 1908)
Species brought into synonymy 
 † Narona austropolonica Bałuk, 1997: synonym of † Aneurystoma afenestrata (Sacco, 1894) (junior synonym)
 Narona coronata (Scacchi, 1835) : synonym of Tribia coronata (Scacchi, 1835)
 Narona hidalgoi Jousseaume, 1887: synonym of Narona clavatula (G.B. Sowerby I, 1832)
 Narona mitriformis (G.B. Sowerby I, 1832): synonym of Hertleinia mitriformis (G.B. Sowerby I, 1832)

References

 Petit R.E. (1975) The cancellariid genera Narona H. & A. Adams and Panarona gen. nov. The Veliger 17(4): 387-388

External links
 Adams, H. & Adams, A. (1853-1858). The genera of Recent Mollusca; arranged according to their organization. London, van Voorst. 

Cancellariidae
Gastropod genera